Basit Abdul Khalid (born 10 August 1996) is a Ghanaian professional footballer who plays as a centre-forward for Kuwaiti club Al-Tadamon.

Club career

Prishtina

2015–16 season
In March 2016, Khalid joined Prishtina of Football Superleague of Kosovo by signing a contract until June 2018. During the remaining 2015–16 season, he scored twice in 10 matches as Prishtina finished 8th in the championship.

2016–17 season
During the 2016–17 season, he bagged 13 goals in 35 league appearances, being top scorer of the team. He also scored his first career hat-trick on 5 April 2017 in matchday 24 against Drita which finished 1–3 for Khalid's side. Prishtina also reached Kosovar Cup final where they defeated Drita 2–1 thanks to Khalid brace.

2017–18 season
The triumph in cup meant that Prishtina has qualified to UEFA Europa League for the first time in history. They were shorted against Sweden's IFK Norrköping. Khalid played in both matches unable to deliver as Prishtina was eliminated 6–0 on aggregate. In October 2017, after dealing for a long time with a meniscus injury, Khalid undergo surgery time and was reported that he will be back in January of the following year.

Teuta Durrës
In August 2019, Abdul Khalid completed a transfer to Albanian Superliga side Teuta Durrës.

Esperance de Tunis
Basit joined Espérance on 25 January 2021 for a two-and-a-half year contract but this contract was terminated by mutual consent on 29 July 2021.

Sheriff Tiraspol
On 17 September 2021, he signed for Moldovan National Division club Sheriff Tiraspol.

Career statistics

Honours
Prishtina

Kosovar Cup: 2017–18
Kosovar Supercup: 2016
ES Tunis

 Tunisian Ligue Professionnelle 1: 2020–21

References

External links

1996 births
Living people
Ghanaian footballers
Ghanaian expatriate footballers
Expatriate footballers in Kosovo
Ghanaian expatriate sportspeople in Kosovo
Expatriate footballers in Albania
Ghanaian expatriate sportspeople in Albania
Expatriate footballers in North Macedonia
Ghanaian expatriate sportspeople in North Macedonia
Expatriate footballers in Tunisia
Ghanaian expatriate sportspeople in Tunisia
Expatriate footballers in Moldova
Ghanaian expatriate sportspeople in Moldova
Association football forwards
Football Superleague of Kosovo players
FC Prishtina players
Kategoria Superiore players
KF Teuta Durrës players
Macedonian First Football League players
FK Makedonija Gjorče Petrov players
Tunisian Ligue Professionnelle 1 players
Espérance Sportive de Tunis players
Moldovan Super Liga players
FC Sheriff Tiraspol players
Kuwait Premier League managers
Ghanaian expatriate sportspeople in Kuwait
Expatriate footballers in Kuwait
Al Tadhamon SC players